Let It Beard is the fifth and final album by the Boston Spaceships, released in 2011. The album charted for one week on Billboard'''s Top Heatseekers chart at #42.

Track listing
All songs written by Robert Pollard.Blind 20-20 - 3.03Juggernaut Vs. Monolith - 1.12Tourist U.F.O. - 4.18Minefield Searcher - 2.17Make A Record For Lo-Life - 3.03Let More Light Into The House - 5.10You Just Can't Tell - 2.01Chevy Marigold - 2.19Earmarked For Collision - 3.45Toppings Take The Cake - 1.09Tabby And Lucy - 3.28(I'll Make It) Strong For You - 1.56A Hair In Every Square Inch Of The House - 4.46The Ballad Of Bad Whiskey - 2.18I Took On The London Guys - 2.40Red Bodies - 2.53A Dozen Blue Overcoats - 1.29Pincushion - 1.15Christmas Girl - 2.48Let It Beard - 4.14The Vice Lords - 3.27German Field Of Shadows - 3.32Speed Bumps - 2.16No Steamboats - 2.38You In My Prayer - 2.30Inspiration Points'' - 5.24

Personnel
Robert Pollard - vocals
John Moen - drums, percussion
Chris Slusarenko - guitar, bass, keyboards

References

2011 albums
Boston Spaceships albums